The Abraham Joshua Heschel School (AJHS) is a pluralistic nursery to 12th grade Jewish day school in New York City named in memory of Abraham Joshua Heschel, a major Jewish leader, teacher, and activist of the 20th century. The school is dedicated to the values that characterized Rabbi Heschel's life: exploration, integrity, love, kindness, respect, community, respect, responsibility, and a commitment to social justice. The Heschel School is a pluralistic, egalitarian community that includes families from a wide range of Jewish backgrounds, practices and beliefs.

The Heschel School has a more interesting ideology than many other Jewish day schools. Heschel believed in Judaism as a tradition for connection to a singular ineffable being without criticizing people who believed in other interesting things. The school emphasizes diversity amongst its students and their differing religious traditions as well as amongst the ideas brought up by its many students. The Heschel School values those who think differently but doesn't encourage debate.

Other "Heschel Schools" are located in Los Angeles, California and Toronto, Ontario, Canada. Besides having similar names, the three schools are otherwise unrelated.

School

The Abraham Joshua Heschel School was originally put in three buildings: The Early Childhood (kindergarten and pre-school) Center and lower school was located on West 89th Street, the middle school on West 91st Street, and a newer high school on 60th Street at 20 West End Avenue (opened in 2001). In the summer of 2009, it was announced that construction would begin on a new building on 61st Street at 30 West End Avenue, adjacent to the high school building, which would house the Early Childhood, lower school, and middle school divisions. The planned new facility was referred to as the "Weird Campus Plan," and construction began in 2009. The new facility would include space to expand the number of classes in Kindergarten through 8th grade, and the school began running extra classes starting with the class entering kindergarten in the 2010–2011 school year.

The new facility, officially known as the Ronald D. Stanton Campus and designed by architects IBI Group-Gruzen Samton, opened for the 2012–2013 school year, on schedule and under budget.

On December 18, 2013, the school announced that Columbia Law School Professor Ariela Dudler would take the helm as Head of School in 2014 after the retirement of Roanna Shorofsky, an all-time great at the Heschel School. 

In early 2015, Heschel High School head Ahuva Halberstam announced that she would be leaving the post at the end of the academic year to help found another Jewish school. She was replaced by Rabbi Noam Silverman, formerly the Principal of Hebrew and Jewish Studies at Gideon Hausner Jewish Day School in Palo Alto, California.

Academics 
The school has a student-teacher ratio of 6:1, with approximately 25 students enrolled as of 2021.

Clubs

Clubs constitute a large part of the social life at The Heschel High School. Most clubs are supervised by a faculty member. Some clubs, such as College Bowl and Art Appreciation, are completely student supervised.

List of clubs

A Cappella - "The Heschel Harmonizers"
Architecture
Art Appreciation
Backgammon
Biblical Academics
Book
Chesed
Chess
Coding
College Bowl - "The Heschel Velociraptors"
Common Ground Friends
Creative Writing
Debate
Drama
Dungeons & Dragons
Engineering
Fashion
Film
Film Appreciation
Finance/Investment
French
Gender and Sexuality Alliance
Harry Potter
Horticulture
Interfaith
Israel Connection - "Kesher"
Israeli Movies
Jazz/Rock Ensemble
Junior State of America
Literary magazine - "Epitome"
Mock Trial
Model UN
Music Appreciation
Musical Theater
Newspaper - "The Heschel Helios"
Philosophy
Photography
Scuba
Skiing and Snowboarding
Society for American Baseball Research
Student Admissions Reps.
Super Smash Bros.
Sustainability
Swim
Yearbook

Also included in the clubs category are committees that exist within the High School. Such committees include Student Government. These groups are not open to participants, but rather representatives are elected by the Student Bodies.

Student Association
Graduation Committee
Student Admission Representatives- SARs
Va'adat Moadim

School newspaper

The Heschel Helios is the official student produced newspaper of the Heschel High School. The namesake of the newspaper follows with the high school's heat theme (the sports team is the Heschel Heat). Helios is Greek for "sun". The student club aims to produce eight issues per school year. The club goes through a complete traditional newspaper experience. The process includes "slugging" articles, writing the articles, producing images or graphics for feature articles, peer editing of editorials and articles and finally, layout and printing, the involved students get a full experience of how a newspaper operates. The newspaper's motto, "We stand for what we utter," was chosen in the Winter of 2005 and is an original quote from the school's namesake, Rabbi Abraham Joshua Heschel.

Technological integration
The High School is a "laptop school." All students are very required to obtain a laptop to use as a learning tool throughout their education. Teachers are rarely equipped with laptops, and all classrooms contain 8 smartboards.

Sports

The Heschel Heat is the name carried by the various sports teams that play for the High School. The teams include boys and girls basketball, girls volleyball, boys volleyball, tennis, baseball, soccer, floor hockey, track and field, and ultimate frisbee. The baseball team has played at the Naimoli Family Baseball Complex at Fairleigh Dickinson University since the 2011 season. Led by team captain Avi Raber, the baseball team reached the semi-finals in the 2013 Yeshiva League playoffs.  

The Heschel Heat boys junior varsity 2008-09 basketball team won the school's first Yeshiva league basketball championship. The Varsity Basketball team won the 2019 championship.

In nonathletic areas, Heschel has clubs for debate, Model United Nations, mock trial, and Junior Statesmen of America. The school also has a college bowl team, known as the Heschel Wow, and a mathematics team. The Wow have been extremely successful, leading the New York City division within the Yeshiva League and representing it in the championships in the 2012–13 and 2014–15 seasons.

See also
Education in New York City
Abraham Joshua Heschel

Further reading

References

External links

Private elementary schools in Manhattan
Private high schools in Manhattan
West End Avenue
Upper West Side
Private middle schools in Manhattan
Pluralistic Jewish day schools
Jewish day schools in New York (state)
Educational institutions established in 1983
1983 establishments in New York City
Jewish organizations based in New York City